Sergio Ismael Díaz Velázquez (born 5 March 1998) is a Paraguayan professional footballer who plays as a forward for Cerro Porteño.

Díaz ranked number one in a list of the most expensive players in Paraguayan football for 2015 published by Diario Extra.

Career

Youth and early career
Díaz played at Club Tacuary School of Football for 1 year, before moving to Cerro Porteño. Díaz arrives at Cerro Porteño aged 10, at the club's school of football. He scored approximately 30 goals in the Cerro Porteño U15 team and was then moved to the reserves team. He was coached by Diego Gavilán in the U15 team. In 2013, he was referred to as the Sergio Aguero of Cerro Porteño as the reserves joined in on a practice session with the first-team.

Cerro Porteño

2014 season
Diaz debuted as a 15-year-old in the Primera División Paraguaya, on 27 June 2014, in a 2–1 home victory against Club General Díaz. He entered the field in the 84th minute for Guillermo Beltrán. Díaz then scored against Nacional Asunción in September, handing Cerro Porteño the victory. The player scored a double in a 2–0 home victory against 3 de Febrero on 8 October 2014. Against Boca Juniors in the Copa Sudamericana, Diaz wore the #22 jersey.

During his performances at the 2015 South American Youth Football Championship in January 2015, it was reported that both Liverpool F.C. and Manchester United F.C. were chasing his signing.

2015 season
In Diaz's debut for Cerro Porteño in the 2015 Primera División Paraguaya season, he scored one goal in his side's 3–0 away victory against Sportivo Luqueño on 14 February 2015. He signed his first professional contract after turning 18 years old and renewed his contract with Club Cerro Porteño until 2021.

Real Madrid
Sergio Diaz is the second Paraguayan to play in Real Madrid preceding Javier Acuña.

He played with Real Madrid B at the beginning of the 2016 season.

Diaz was included in Real Madrid U19 squad for UEFA Youth League, making his debut against Sporting Club de Portugal. Diaz scored the opener for Los Blancos, but Sporting eventually equalized.

Loan to CD Lugo
On 10 August 2017, Díaz was loaned to Segunda División club CD Lugo for one year. He suffered a knee injury on 16 November 2017, which kept him out for the rest of the season.

Loan to Corinthians
A year later, on 30 July 2018, he was loaned to Brazilian club Corinthians, for one and a half-year.

Loan to Cerro Porteño
Díaz returned to Cerro Porteño on loan for the 2019–2020 Paraguayan Primera División season.

Loan to Club América
On 29 July 2020, Díaz joined Liga MX side América on loan with an option to buy.

International career
In January 2015, Díaz was selected to represent Paraguay U20 at the 2015 South American Youth Football Championship.

The player scored one goal in his debut at the 2016 Toulon Tournament for Paraguay U23.

Díaz held representative honours with the Paraguay national under-23 squad at the 2020 CONMEBOL Pre-Olympic Tournament.

Personal life
Sergio is a self-proclaimed fan of the English football club Arsenal, which he in May 2015 described as his dream destination in the future.

Career statistics

Club

Honours
Corinthians
Campeonato Paulista: 2019

References

External links

1998 births
Living people
Paraguayan footballers
Association football forwards
2015 South American Youth Football Championship players
Paraguayan Primera División players
Cerro Porteño players
Segunda División B players
Real Madrid Castilla footballers
Segunda División players
Liga MX players
CD Lugo players
Sport Club Corinthians Paulista players
Club América footballers
Paraguay under-20 international footballers
Paraguay international footballers
Paraguayan expatriate footballers
Paraguayan expatriate sportspeople in Brazil
Expatriate footballers in Brazil
Paraguayan expatriate sportspeople in Spain
Expatriate footballers in Spain
Paraguayan expatriate sportspeople in Mexico
Expatriate footballers in Mexico
People from Itauguá